Tony Roques (born 7 September 1978 in Bromley) is a former rugby union player who played at flanker for the Cornish All Blacks and the England national rugby sevens team.

Head of Rugby for a year at The Leys School in Cambridge. He then became assistant coach for the England Sevens team until 2018. From 2018 he has been the coach for the USA Rugby Sevens team.

2021 - Coach for the Great Britain Rugby 7s team at the Tokyo Olympics

References

External links 
 England profile
 Exeter Chiefs Profile

1978 births
Living people
English rugby union players
Rugby union flankers
Rugby union players from Bromley